Marjorie Dias de Oliveira (born 8 March 1982), known professionally as Marjorie Estiano, is a Brazilian actress and singer-songwriter. She became nationally known for her role in TV Globo's teen soap opera Malhação.

In film, Estiano was the lead role in Time and the Wind, Good Manners, among others.

In television, she was the lead role in three telenovelas, including International Emmy Award-winning Side by Side, and four series. In 2019, she was nominated for the International Emmy Award for Best Actress for her role in Under Pressure.

Biography
Born in Curitiba, Paraná state as Marjorie Dias de Oliveira to Eurandir Lima de Oliveira and Marilene Dias, the second of three siblings, Marjorie Estiano studied Scenic Arts in Escola Estadual do Paraná. When she finished, she moved to São Paulo to improve her acting abilities. There she studied music for two years in Faculdade Paulista de Artes

Career
While studying, she made some TV commercials and played minor plays in theater. After this, she was approved in the TV Globo Actor's Workshop and moved to Rio de Janeiro. She then signed to join the cast of Malhação, and began acting in minor roles. She won the lead antagonist role of "Natasha" in 2004.

She began sharing the vocals of the band with singer, Gustavo (Guilherme Berenguer). Victor Pozas and Alexandre Castilho started recording demo tapes with Estiano and sending them to record labels. Universal Music was interested, and hired Estiano. After several months in studio, her self-titled debut album was released. The first single, "Você Sempre Será" (You Will Always Be), which was performed previously in Malhação, hit the top of Brazilian charts, and won the Faustão's The Best of the Year award for Song of the Year.

The second single, "Por Mais Que Eu Tente" (The More I Try), was her second top ten hit, and the third single "O Jogo" (The Game) peaked just outside the top ten, but still enjoyed success. Thanks to the enormous airplay of the song "Você 
Sempre Será", her album went platinum. In 2005 released the first live DVD, titled Marjorie Estiano e Banda Ao Vivo.

In prime time, she stood out in telenovelas Pages of Life (Páginas da Vida) (2006), Duas Caras (2007), India: A Love Story (Caminho das Índias) (2009) and Império.

In 2007, she was the protagonist of the telenovela Two Faces (Duas Caras), which tells the story Maria Paula's revenge against Marconi Ferraço, his former criminal husband. Also in 2007, she released her second studio album, Flores, Amores e Blábláblá.

She played Manuela Fonseca in the 2011 Rede Globo telenovela A Vida da Gente in access prime time. The telenovela is about the love triangle between Ana, Rodrigo and Manuela, and family dramas lived by them after a tragic accident.

During the premiere of the play Mind Deception, actor and producer Malvino Salvador late on Thursday (11th), Rio de Janeiro, Estiano took the opportunity to talk about the work of two that will air in January 2011, called Amor em Quatro Atos (Love in Four Acts). The series of four chapters, will be based on four songs by Chico Buarque: "Between rehearsals and recordings were 20 days of living together and he's great," said the actress, who used to apply a wavy hair to play the part. In the chapter she makes movies, plays a filmmaker called Marjorie involved in filming the video for the song "Construction" and in the middle of the episode will complain about the noise of the work and know the neighbor's character Malvino, the role of Mason.

She played the protagonist Laura Assunção in Lado a Lado (2012), telenovela that tells the story of a friendship between two women Laura, a white girl, daughter of a baroness, and Isabel, descendant of a poor slave. Based on the novel's trilogy of the same name, by Erico Verissimo, Time and the Wind (2013) follows 150 years of family Terra Cambará and their opponent Amaral family.

In 2014, she was the lead antagonist Cora in Império, best telenovela in the 2015 Emmy International, the story of José Alfredo who builds an empire when he is separated from his love for Cora. She was a married woman who falls in love with another woman in serie Eu que Amo Tanto (2014). In September 2014 she released her third studio album, titled Oito.

The movie Sob Pressão (2016) follows the emergency department doctors and nurses of a precarious public hospital in Rio de Janeiro. She played the character corresponding to Madame de Tourvel in the Brazilian version (2016) of Les Liaisons dangereuses. In Justice (2016), she plays a dancer who became a quadriplegic and suffers euthanasia. In the 1930s movie Entre Irmãs (2017), two sisters separated by fate face prejudice and sexism: one from the big city high society, the other from a group of country renegades. Inspired by the eponymous movie, in 2017 she premiered the series Sob Pressão (2017–2021), where Estiano played Dr. Carolina again and earned her an International Emmy Award for Best Actress.

Filmography

Television

Film

Stage

Discography 

Marjorie Estiano (2005)
Flores, Amores e Blábláblá (2007)
Oito (2014)

Tours
2005–2006: Marjorie Estiano e Banda (Marjorie Estiano and Band)
2007–2008: Turnê Blablablá (Blablabla Tour)
2009–2010: Combinação Sobre Todas as Coisas (Combination Above All Things)
2013 – 2014: BB Covers
2014: Oito
2016: Nívea Rock

Music recording sales certification
2005: DVD gold the 25 thousand copies sold of the DVD Marjorie Estiano e Banda (Ao Vivo).
2005: Platinum by 150 thousand copies sold of the CD Marjorie Estiano.
2009: Download Gold, Por mais que eu tente.

Awards and nominations

Recognitions 
 2011: Best Actress, Critic's Choice – Minha Novela, for A Vida da Gente.
 2012: Best romantic couple, Critic's Choice – Minha Novela, for Lado a Lado.
 2014: Best Villains, Critic's Choice – Noveleiros, for Império.

References

External links
 Marjorie Estiano official website (Portuguese)
 Marjorie Estiano on Universal Music website (Portuguese)
 Oito on Deezer website (Portuguese)
 List of Estiano's albums/DVDs
 

1982 births
Brazilian telenovela actresses
Living people
Actresses from Curitiba
Brazilian pop singers
21st-century Brazilian singers
21st-century Brazilian women singers